Radka Bobková was the defending champion, but lost in first round to Petra Begerow.

Irina Spîrlea won the title by defeating Brenda Schultz 6–4, 1–6, 7–6(7–5) in the final.

Seeds

Draw

Finals

Top half

Bottom half

References

External links
 Official results archive (ITF)
 Official results archive (WTA)

Torneo Internazional Femmin di Palermo - Singles
1994 Singles